In geometry, a trigonal trapezohedron is a rhombohedron (a polyhedron with six rhombus-shaped faces) in which, additionally, all six faces are congruent. Alternative names for the same shape are the trigonal deltohedron or isohedral rhombohedron. Some sources just call them rhombohedra.

Geometry
Six identical rhombic faces can construct two configurations of trigonal trapezohedra. The acute or prolate form has three acute angle corners of the rhombic faces meeting at the two polar axis vertices. The obtuse or oblate or flat form has three obtuse angle corners of the rhombic faces meeting at the two polar axis vertices.

More strongly than having all faces congruent, the trigonal trapezohedra are isohedral figures, meaning that they have symmetries that take any face to any other face.

Special cases
A cube can be interpreted as a special case of a trigonal trapezohedron, with square rather than rhombic faces.

The two golden rhombohedra are the acute and obtuse form of the trigonal trapezohedron with golden rhombus faces.
Copies of these can be assembled to form other convex polyhedra with golden rhombus faces, including the Bilinski dodecahedron and rhombic triacontahedron.

Four oblate rhombohedra whose ratio of face diagonal lengths are the square root of two can be assembled to form a rhombic dodecahedron. The same rhombohedra also tile space in the trigonal trapezohedral honeycomb.

Related polyhedra
The trigonal trapezohedra are special cases of trapezohedra, polyhedra with an even number of congruent kite-shaped faces. When this number of faces is six, the kites degenerate to rhombi, and the result is a trigonal trapezohedron. As with the rhombohedra more generally, the trigonal trapezohedra are also special cases of parallelepipeds, and are the only parallelepipeds with six congruent faces. Parallelepipeds are zonohedra, and Evgraf Fedorov proved that the trigonal trapezohedra are the only infinite family of zonohedra whose faces are all congruent rhombi.

Dürer's solid is generally presumed to be a truncated triangular trapezohedron, a trigonal trapezohedron with two opposite vertices truncated, although its precise shape is still a matter for debate.

See also 
 Truncated triangular trapezohedron

References

External links
 

Space-filling polyhedra
Zonohedra
Polyhedra